Brandon Jenkins may refer to:

 Brandon Jenkins (American football) (born 1990), American football player
 Brandon Jenkins (musician) (1969–2018), American country-music singer-songwriter
 Brandon Jenkins (basketball), American basketball player for Basket-club Boncourt

See also
 Brendan Jenkins (born 1959), Australian politician